The following are international rankings of Sri Lanka.

Geography

Demographics

Economy

Politics

References

Sri Lanka